Emilia di Liverpool (Emilia of Liverpool; also given as L'eremitaggio di Liverpool) is a dramma semiserio, ("half-serious") dramatic opera, in two acts with music by Gaetano Donizetti.   wrote the Italian libretto after the anonymous libretto for Vittorio Trento's Emilia di Laverpaut, itself based on Stefano Scatizzi's play of the same name.  It premiered on 28 July 1824 at the Teatro Nuovo in Naples.

Composition history
The libretto had a complex history.  The original story by Scatizzi formed the basis of the first, anonymous libretto of 1824, which had the title of Emilia di Liverpool.  This first libretto included the introduction of the Count, a Neapolitan character, as comic relief per the theatrical tradition of the Teatro Nuovo.  The changes to the cast of characters caused confusion among the relationships of the characters and ran contrary to the structure of the original play.  The libretto revisions by Checcherini, circa 1828, removed much of the material of the 1824 version, with further revisions to the characters, but maintaining the plot chronology of the 1824 version.  The 1828 revision, known as L'eremitaggio di Liverpool (The Hermitage of Liverpool), also reduced the amount of spoken dialogue.

Performance history
The 1828 version was given its premiere in Naples on 8 March 1828 and received only six performances. The 1824 version "was revived in 1838 for three performances, and again in 1871".

It was not until 1957 that it received another presentation of any kind, until its UK premiere on 12 June in Liverpool.  In September 1957 the BBC presented an abridged radio version which starred the young Joan Sutherland, "who gave a stunning exhibition of her Donizetti style a good eighteen months before her Covent Garden success in Lucia di Lammermoor.

Roles

Synopsis 
Time: The past
Place: A village near Liverpool

Emilia, daughter of Claudio, the "Count of Liverpool", lives in a hermitage doing good works among the people of Liverpool. Years earlier she had rejected the noble Don Romualdo to elope with Federico. But Federico merely seduced and abandoned her. Her mother died of shame and her father disappeared in pursuit of his daughter's seducer. Since that time, Emilia had lived a holy life of penitence and charity, but  years later, Emilia's charitable work is disturbed by the arrival of two strangers who have been stranded in a storm. One is Federico, now repentant; the other is Claudio who had been captured by Barbary pirates and imprisoned for many years. A third man, her former suitor Don Romualdo, also appears.

Don Romualdo is still willing to marry Emilia, but she rejects him. Federico attempts to prove that he is  repentant, but Claudio challenges him to a duel with pistols. The two men begin to fight, but are stopped by Emilia who is able to prevent them from firing any shots. She announces her belief that Federico is reformed, says that they are in love, and that they plan to marry.  Everyone rejoices.

Recordings

References
Notes

Cited sources
Ashbrook, William (1982), Donizetti and His Operas, Cambridge University Press.  
Ashbrook, William and Sarah Hibberd (2001), in  Holden, Amanda (Ed.), The New Penguin Opera Guide, New York: Penguin Putnam. .  pp. 224 – 247.
Osborne, Charles, (1994),  The Bel Canto Operas of Rossini, Donizetti, and Bellini,  Portland, Oregon: Amadeus Press. 

Other sources
Allitt, John Stewart (1991), Donizetti: in the light of Romanticism and the teaching of Johann Simon Mayr, Shaftesbury: Element Books, Ltd (UK); Rockport, MA: Element, Inc.(USA)
Ashbrook, William (1998), "Donizetti, Gaetano" in Stanley Sadie  (Ed.),  The New Grove Dictionary of Opera, Vol. One. London: Macmillan Publishers, Inc.   
Black, John (1982), Donizetti’s Operas in Naples, 1822—1848. London: The Donizetti Society.
Loewenberg, Alfred (1970). Annals of Opera, 1597-1940, 2nd edition.  Rowman and Littlefield
Sadie, Stanley, (Ed.); John Tyrell (Exec. Ed.) (2004), The New Grove Dictionary of Music and Musicians.  2nd edition. London: Macmillan.    (hardcover).   (eBook).
 Weinstock, Herbert (1963), Donizetti and the World of Opera in Italy, Paris, and Vienna in the First Half of the Nineteenth Century, New York: Pantheon Books.

External links
  Donizetti Society (London) website
  Libretto for Emilia di Liverpool 

1824 operas
Italian-language operas
Opera semiseria
Operas
Operas by Gaetano Donizetti
Operas based on plays
Operas set in England